Neža Maurer Škofič (born 22 December 1930) is a Slovene poet and writer. She writes for children, young adults and adults and has also worked as a translator, journalist, editor and teacher. 
 
Neža Maurer was born in the village of Podvin near Polzela in 1930. She trained as a teacher in Ljubljana and taught in schools in Črni vrh nad Idrijo and Ilirska Bistrica and at the same time got a degree in Slavistics from the University of Ljubljana. She worked as a journalist and programme coordinator for youth programmes at TV Ljubljana and as a contributor and editor at numerous magazines and journals. She lives in Preddvor and as a retired artist continues to be a prolific writer and poet.

In 2010 she received the Poetry Gold Medal for her life's work.

Published works

For young adults and children

Poetry
 , 1970
 Kam pa teče voda, 1972
 Kako spi veverica, 1975
 Kostanjev škratek, 1980
 Beli muc, 1981
 Kadar Vanči riše, 1985
 Televizijski otroci, 1986
 Uh, kakšne laži, 1987
 Iskal sem kukavico, 1989
 Bratec Kratekčas, 1989
 Oče Javor, 1990
 Muca frizerka, 1995
 Kdo, 1997
 Od srede do petka, 1997
 Sloni v spačku, 1997
 Kostanjev škratek, 1997
 Velik sončen dan, 2000
 Kdo se oglaša, 2003
 Zajčkova telovadba, 2004
 Pišem, berem A,B,C, 2005

Prose
 Čukec, 1978
 Koruzni punčki, 1993
 Zvesti jazbec, 1999
 Dica Prstančica, 2001
 Ti si moje srce, 2008

For Adults

Poetry
 Skorja dlani in skorja kruha, 1969
 Ogenj do zadnjega diha, 1973
 Čas, ko je vse prav, 1978
 U službi života, 1978
 Tej poti se reče želja, 1984
 Drevo spoznanja, 1987
 Kadar ljubimo, 1990
 Litanije za mir, 1991
 Od mene k tebi, 1993
 Leva stran neba, 1994
 Wenn wir lieben, 1995
 The veiled landscape, 1995
 , 1997
 Igra za življenje, 1999
 Zbrana dela I.del, 2000
 Zbrana dela II. del, 2003
 Zmenek, 2004
 Raj, 2007
 Od mene k tebi, 2007
 Na tvojo kožo pišem svoje verze, 2008
 Piramide upanja, 2010
 Sama sva na svetu – ti in jaz, 2010

Prose
 Zveza mora ostati, 1967
 Dom za telohov cvet, 1999
 Velika knjiga pravljic, 1999

References

Slovenian women poets
Slovenian poets
Slovenian journalists
Slovenian women journalists
Living people
1930 births
University of Ljubljana alumni
People from the Municipality of Polzela